Jay Malla, also known as Joy Malla & Jai Malla, was the son of Adi Malla, the founder of the  Mallabhum (Malla Dynasty).

History
According to Chanda (2004), Adi Malla ruled at the palace for sixteen years, from 694 CE. to 710 CE. After his death his son Jay Malla became king.

Jay Malla was also famous for his bravery and military skill, that was supposedly similar to that of his father.

References

Sources
 
 O’Malley, L.S.S., ICS, Bankura, Bengal District Gazetteers, pp. 21-46(24), 1995 reprint, first published 1908, Government of West Bengal

Malla rulers of the Bankura
Kings of Mallabhum
8th-century Indian monarchs
Mallabhum